Via Princessa station is a Metrolink (California) train station located in the Canyon Country neighborhood of the city of Santa Clarita, California. It is served by Metrolink's Antelope Valley Line between Los Angeles Union Station and Lancaster station.

History 
When Metrolink service first began in 1992, trains terminated at the Santa Clarita station, but with plans to extend the line northeast to the Antelope Valley. Those plans were expedited by almost 10 years when the 1994 Northridge earthquake caused the collapse of the freeway connector of State Route 14 onto Interstate 5 at the Newhall Pass interchange. With funding from the Federal Emergency Management Agency the Metrolink constructed an emergency extension of the line along existing rails to Lancaster to help relieve the traffic bottleneck.

The U.S. Navy Seabees construction battalion and crews from the L.A. County Public Works Department were able to construct the stations along the line in just a few days, compared to the normal three to six months. Emergency stations in Lancaster and Palmdale were built in just three days, and Metrolink started operating trains one week after the earthquake struck.

After the earthquake, the existing Santa Clarita station had become crowded as ridership surged. Metrolink built the Via Princessa station to relieve some of that crowding. The Via Princessa station was the last of the emergency stations to be built and opened on February 7, 1994, exactly three weeks after the earthquake hit. The station, like the other emergency stations, offered few amenities on opening day. There was only an asphalt platform, furnished with a few bus stop-style shelters, and a 400 space paved parking lot.

While most of the other emergency stations have since been replaced with permanent stations, the Via Princessa station remains remarkably similar to this day. The station still uses the same asphalt platform built after the earthquake. In the months following the earthquake, permanent shelters were added to the station (although the bus stop-style shelters remained), along with a covered area to purchase tickets from ticket vending machines and a small security guard office. In October 2008, a permanent building containing public restrooms and an office for station security officers was constructed in the station parking lot.

In the future, Via Princessa station may be replaced or supplemented by a new station in Santa Clarita's future Vista Canyon development. In May 2018, Caltrans announced that it would grant $8.9 million towards the total cost of $28.2 million to build the new Vista Canyon station.

Service

Connections 
, City of Santa Clarita Transit provides minimal direct local bus service to the station on local route 12. The trips are timed to meet the trains, on weekday mornings five trips from Canyon Country drop off passengers at the station, and on weekday evenings four trips pick up passengers at the station and travel to Canyon Country.

For passengers using bicycles, there is an entrance to the Santa Clara River Trail on Whites Canyon Road, an approximately  ride north of the station. The City of Santa Clarita offers bicycle lockers for rent at the station for passengers who regularly travel to the station by bike.

See also 
Lang Southern Pacific Station a California Historic Landmark

References

External links 

Metrolink stations in Los Angeles County, California
Railway stations in the United States opened in 1994
Santa Clarita, California